Huochong was the Chinese name for hand cannons. The oldest confirmed metal huochong, also the first cannon, is a bronze hand cannon bearing an inscription dating it to 1298 (see Xanadu gun).

By the time of the Ming Dynasty (1368–1644) two types of huochong were in use. One was a hand held version with a wooden shaft known as a shouchong whilst the larger Wankouchong ( — bowl-mouthed cannon) or Zhankouchong ( — cup-mouthed cannon) rested on a supporting wooden frame. It was invented presumably as an advance in warfare, a new way to fight.

Gallery

See also 

 Hu dun pao, the term refers to trebuchet and cannon.
 Heilongjiang hand cannon, hand cannon, ca. 1287–1288.
 Xanadu gun, a bowl-mouthed hand cannon, 1298.
 Wuwei Bronze Cannon, late Western Xia (1214–1227).
 Gunpowder weapons in the Song dynasty
 Military of the Yuan dynasty
 Bedil tombak, Nusantaran hand cannon.

References

Early firearms
Military history of Imperial China
Firearms of China
Chinese inventions